Chixi is a town under the jurisdiction of Cangnan County, Wenzhou City, Zhejiang Province, People's Republic of China.

Administrative divisions 
Chixi Town administers the following village-level administrative division units:

Chixi, Nanxing Village, Banyang Village, Si'an Village, Baiwan Village, Liuqi'ao Village, Yuanyuan Village, Xinzhi Village, Hujing Village, Yuanyu Village, Shuanglian Village, Zhongdun Community, Wangjiashan Village, Nantou Village, Shapo Village, Diaobideng Village, Shitang Village, Anfeng Village, Yuxi Village, Wudongqiao Village, Xindong Village, and Xiamen Village.

Chixi Wudong Bridge 

The Chixi Wudong Bridge was included in the sixth batch of national-level key cultural relics protection units on May 25, 2006. The date of the construction of the bridge is unknown, but it was rebuilt in the third year of Xianchun in the Southern Song Dynasty (1267). It is a five-hole beam stone bridge with a north–south direction, 24.6 meters long and 1.7 meters wide.

References 

Cangnan County
Township-level divisions of Zhejiang